Mesopontonia monodactylus is a species of shrimp in the family Palaemonidae that was first described in 1991.

References

Palaemonoidea
Crustaceans of the Pacific Ocean
Crustaceans described in 1991
Taxa named by Alexander James Bruce